The Davenport House is a Tudor Revival house built in 1921 in Greer, South Carolina The house was listed on the National Register of Historic Places in 1999.

Architecture
The  house was designed by Greenville architects James Douthit Beacham and Leon LeGrand. It is a two-story house constructed of hand-made yellow brick, timber, and stucco. It has a one-story, glass-enclosed porch on the east and porte cochere on the west. There is a three-bay coach house and pool house as well as a brick and timber pergola in the garden.

References

National Register of Historic Places in Greenville County, South Carolina
Tudor Revival architecture in South Carolina
Houses completed in 1921
Houses on the National Register of Historic Places in South Carolina
Houses in Greenville County, South Carolina
Greer, South Carolina